Denton is an English surname. It refers to someone from the location Denton, of which there are several, including in Yorkshire, Kent, Lancashire, Norfolk, and Lincolnshire.

Notable persons with this surname
 Andrew Denton (born 1960), Australian media personality
 Daniel Denton (c. 1626 – 1703), early American colonist and writer
 Denice Denton (1959–2006), American academician
 George Chardin Denton (1851–1928), British colonial governor
 George H. Denton (born 1939), American geologist and glaciologist
 George K. Denton (1864–1926), American politician
 James Denton (actor) (born 1963), American film and television actor
 Jeremiah Denton (1924–2014), American politician (former U.S. Senator, R-AL)
 Jim Denton, rugby league footballer of the 1920s and 1930s
 John B. Denton (1806–1841), American preacher, lawyer, soldier
 John Bailey Denton (1814–1893), English surveyor, and civil engineer
 Kit Denton (1928–1997), Australian author
 Mary Florence Denton (1857–1947), American educator in Japan
 Michael Denton (born 1943), British-Australian biochemist
 Nancy Denton, American sociologist
 Nick Denton (born 1966), founder of Gawker Media
 Randy Denton (born 1949), American basketball player
 Richard Denton (1586–1662), Founded one of the first Presbyterian churches in America
 Sandra Denton  (born 1964), American/Jamaican hip hop artist and part of Salt n Pepa
 Sherman Foote Denton (1854–1937), American naturalist and illustrator
 Trevor Denton, English rugby league footballer who played in the 1960s and 1970s
 Will Denton (born 1990), American actor
 William Denton (geologist) (1823-1883), occultist preacher and writer
 Winfield K. Denton (1896–1971), American politician

In fiction:
 JC Denton, the main character in the video game Deus Ex

See also

 Baron Denton, subsidiary title of Earl Kitchener of Khartoum in the Peerage of the United Kingdom
 Danton (name)

References

English-language surnames
English toponymic surnames